Psallodema is a genus of mostly European capsid bugs in the tribe Phylini, erected by V.G. Putshkov in 1970.
The species Psallodema fieberi is recorded from northern Europe including the British Isles.

Species 
According to BioLib the following are included:
 Psallodema fieberi (Fieber, 1864) - synonym Asciodema fieberi (Fieber, 1864)
 Psallodema intergerina V.G. Putshkov, 1970
 Psallodema kasja Drapolyuk, 1987
 Psallodema ulmicola V.G. Putshkov, 1970

See also
 List of heteropteran bugs recorded in Britain

References

External links
 

Miridae genera
Hemiptera of Europe
Phylini